Ploiarium is a genus of three species of woody plants in the family Bonnetiaceae. It is native to tropical forests and peat swamp forests in Southeast Asia including southern Indochina, Malay Peninsula, Sumatra, and Borneo. Species are generally slow growing with irregular flowering and fruiting cycles. Colonization of plants by arbuscular mycorrhizal fungi is known to  improve growth and biomass.

Chemistry 
Species of Ploiarium are used in medicine as they contain compounds that possess antimicrobial activity. Several xanthones have been discovered in the stems and bark of P. elegans including: ploiarixanthone, euxanmodin A, and euxanmodin B. The anthraquinones emodin, ploiariquinone A, and 1,8-dihydroxy-3-methoxy-6- methyl-anthraquinone have also been reported from the genus. Triterpenoid benzoates are also reported from the bark of P. elegans. Leaf extracts contain a diverse array of terpenoids, alkaloids, polyphenols, flavonoids, steroids, and saponins and have been studied for their anti-bacterial properties, particularly against Propionibacterium, responsible for skin acne.

References 

Bonnetiaceae
Plants described in 1841
Malpighiales genera